Salhane is a station on İZBAN's Northern Line. Salhane opened in 2001, and was serviced by the Basmane-Aliağa Regional and the Alsancak-Çiğli Commuter Line. Service was suspended between 2006 and 2010, where the station was rebuilt. Service re-opened on December 5, 2010, with the inauguration of İZBAN's Northern Line.

Railway stations in İzmir Province
Railway stations opened in 2001
2001 establishments in Turkey
Railway stations closed in 2006
2006 disestablishments in Turkey
Bayraklı District